Islandton is an unincorporated community and census-designated place in Colleton County, South Carolina, United States. As of the 2010 census, its population was 70. South Carolina Highway 63 passes through the community, leading east  to Walterboro, the county seat, and southwest  to Varnville. Islandton has a post office with ZIP code 29929.

Demographics

Education
Colleton County School District is the area school district. The public high school for the entire county is Colleton County High School.

References

Census-designated places in South Carolina
Census-designated places in Colleton County, South Carolina
Unincorporated communities in South Carolina
Unincorporated communities in Colleton County, South Carolina